Junior Olympics or Jr. Olympics may refer to:

AAU Junior Olympic Games, annual competition for multiple sports sponsored by the US Amateur Athletic Union
USA Gymnastics Junior Olympics Program

See also
 International Children's Games
 Youth Olympic Games